La Lande-Patry is a commune in the Orne department in north-western France. The commune is known for its Ifs millénaires (thousand year old yews), designated as an intangible cultural heritage in France.

See also
 Communes of the Orne department

References

Landepatry